SCLC may refer to:

 Southern Christian Leadership Conference, an American civil rights organization
 San Cristóbal de las Casas, a city in Chiapas, Mexico
 Small-cell lung carcinoma
 Supply Chain Leadership Collaboration, in the Carbon Disclosure Project
 Space charge limited current, in space charge 
 Seattle Central Labor Council (1905–1919), a historical name for the King County Labor Council